Damith Gunatilleke (born 8 April 1983) is a Sri Lankan former cricketer. He played in 39 first-class and 26 List A matches between 1998/99 and 2012/13. He made his Twenty20 debut on 17 August 2004, for Kurunegala Youth Cricket Club in the 2004 SLC Twenty20 Tournament.

References

External links
 

1983 births
Living people
Sri Lankan cricketers
Kurunegala Youth Cricket Club cricketers
Saracens Sports Club cricketers
Sri Lanka Air Force Sports Club cricketers
Place of birth missing (living people)